The Taifa of Niebla was an Arab taifa kingdom that existed during three distinct time periods: from 1023 to 1053, from 1145 to 1150 and from 1234 to 1262.

From 1053 until 1091 it was under the forcible control of Taifa of Seville, by Abbad II al-Mu'tadid. It was finally conquered by the Crown of Castile. In 1262 it was eventually absorbed by Castile.

List of Emirs

Yahsubid dynasty
Abu'l-Abbas Ahmad: 1023/4–1041/2
Muhammad al-Yahsubi Izz ad-Dawla: 1041/2–1051/2
Abu Nars Fath: 1051/2–1053/4
To Seville: 1053/4–1091
To Morocco: 1091–c. 1145

Bitruyid dynasty
Yusuf al-Bitruyi (in Tejada 1146–1150): 1145–11??, d. 1150
al-Wahbi: 11??–1150
To Morocco: 1150–1234

Mahfuzid dynasty
Su'ayb: 1234–1262
To Castile thereafter.

See also
 List of Sunni Muslim dynasties

References

Niebla
History of Seville
States and territories established in 1023
States and territories disestablished in 1262
11th century in Al-Andalus
Gharb Al-Andalus
Arab dynasties